The 1939 Chicago Cardinals season was their 20th in the league. The team failed to improve on their previous output of 2–9, winning only one game. They played eight of their eleven games on the road and failed to qualify for the playoffs for the 14th consecutive season.

Schedule

Standings

References

1939
Chicago Cardinals
Chicago